Arrington is an unincorporated community in Kapioma Township, Atchison County, Kansas, United States.

History
Arrington was platted in 1884.

References

Further reading

External links
 Atchison County maps: Current, Historic, KDOT

Unincorporated communities in Atchison County, Kansas
Unincorporated communities in Kansas
1884 establishments in Kansas
Populated places established in 1884